Jean-Jacques Sanquer (29 November 1946 – 6 June 1984) was a French racing cyclist. He rode in the 1971 Tour de France.

References

1946 births
1984 deaths
French male cyclists
Place of birth missing